William Robert Dick (September 1, 1878 – June 1, 1961) was a Canadian politician. He served in the Legislative Assembly of British Columbia from 1928 to 1933 from the electoral district of Vancouver City, as a Conservative.

References

1878 births
1961 deaths
British Columbia Conservative Party MLAs